Tsinghua University School of Law is the law school of Tsinghua University founded in 1929. It is a part of Tsinghua University. The restructuring of the higher education system in China led to the Law School's merger with Peking University and other universities in 1952. It was reestablished in 1995 and has operated continuously since. As of 2016, it is ranked 2nd among law schools in China.

References

Tsinghua University
Law schools in China
Educational institutions established in 1929
1929 establishments in China